Route 81 is a highway in northeastern Missouri.  Its northern terminus is at the Iowa state line where it continues as Iowa Highway 81.  Its southern terminus is at Route 16 west of Canton.

Route description
Route 81 starts at the Iowa state line from Iowa Route 81. It continues south into the town of Kahoka and then intersects with US Route 136. As it continues south, there are several sharp turns. It ends outside of the town Canton, near an interchange with US 61 and intersects with Route 16. The route starts in Clark county and ends in Lewis county.

History

Major intersections

References 

081
Transportation in Lewis County, Missouri
Transportation in Clark County, Missouri